Edward Charles Riley (9 August 1892 – 9 June 1969) was an Australian politician. He was an Australian Labor Party member of the Australian House of Representatives from 1922 to 1934, representing the seat of Cook.

Riley was the son of Labor politician Edward Riley. Prior to entering politics, he worked at the Cockatoo Island Dockyard, served as secretary of the Commonwealth Public Service Clerical Officers Association and later as NSW state secretary of the Federated Clerks' Union. He enlisted to serve in World War I in September 1916, serving until April 1919.

He was elected to the House of Representatives at the 1922 election following a contentious Labor preselection that had to be re-run twice following allegations of irregularities. His victory resulted in the first time a father and son had sat together in federal parliament. He served as Government Whip from 1929. He held the seat until 1934, when he was defeated by Jock Garden, the Lang Labor candidate.

After leaving politics, Riley became a prominent advertising executive and served on the board of trustees of the Australian War Memorial from 1930 to 1966. He died in 1969.

References

Australian Labor Party members of the Parliament of Australia
Members of the Australian House of Representatives for Cook (1906–1955)
Members of the Australian House of Representatives
1892 births
1969 deaths
20th-century Australian politicians